Blind Justice is a 1986 American drama television film directed by Rod Holcomb and starring Tim Matheson, Mimi Kuzyk, and Philip Charles MacKenzie. It was written by Josephine Cummings and Richard Yalem. The film first aired on March 9, 1986 on CBS. The film is based on a true story.

Background
The film stars Tim Matheson as Jim Anderson, Mimi Kuzyk as Cathy Anderson and Philip Charles MacKenzie as John Pierson. Others in the film include Lisa Eichhorn as Carolyn Shetland, Tom Atkins as Kramer and John Kellogg as Jim's father.

For years after the film's original broadcast, the film remained on out-of-print VHS only, released in America via Fox Home Entertainment. Another out-of-print version was released in Brazil via Abril Vídeo, whilst a now out-of-print VHS release via CBS/Fox Video Ltd was also released in the UK. In July 2012, the DVD was given a DVD release in America only via CBS Home Entertainment, which is now manufactured on demand using DVD-R recordable media via Amazon.com only.

Plot
The average world of an average man turns upside down when he is arrested as the prime suspect in a series of rapes and robberies. In a gripping tale, professional photographer Jim Anderson (Tim Matheson) becomes trapped in a web of circumstantial evidence. After a zealous policeman arrests Anderson for indecent exposure for urinating during his morning run, he is soon fingered by witnesses as the criminal in relation to the rapes and robberies, despite his innocence. For the next 14 months, his life is hell. The case against him is so strong and his resemblance to the criminal is so exact, he begins to question his own innocence. Wrongly-accused and suffering the growing suspicions of his loyal wife (Mimi Kuzyk), Anderson begins to crack under the strain of clearing his name. He is forced to endure the ruthlessness of a police and legal system that becomes convinced that they have the right man. It also examines the personal impact that comes from such an assault. Too much circumstantial evidence surrounds the case, and too much information leaks out to the public; even if Anderson beats the rap, he'll be ruined in his community. Police Officer Kramer (Tom Atkins) is determined to bring him to justice, whilst Carolyn Shetland (Lisa Eichhorn) is Anderson's defense attorney.

Cast
 Tim Matheson as Jim Anderson
 Mimi Kuzyk as Cathy Anderson
 Philip Charles MacKenzie as John Pierson
 Lisa Eichhorn as Carolyn Shetland
 Tom Atkins as Kramer
 John Kellogg as Jim's father
 David Froman as Pike
 Anne Haney as Jim's mother
 Linda Thorson as Pamela
 Marilyn Lightstone as Dr. Lathrop
 John M. Jackson as the Porter
 Jack Blessing as Larry
 Ann Ryerson as Leslie
 Sam Dalton as (uncredited role)
 Daniel Davis as Attorney Seth Thompson
 Tristan Hickey as Ray Carter

Critical reception
Allmovie gave the film three out of five stars, writing "Blind Justice is a fact-based TV movie starring Tim Matheson, here made to look "normal" with glasses and mustache."

References

External links
 

1986 television films
1986 films
1986 drama films
1980s English-language films
American films based on actual events
CBS network films
Drama films based on actual events
American drama television films
Films directed by Rod Holcomb
Films scored by Miles Goodman
Television films based on actual events
1980s American films